Cape Mayo is a bare rock cliff on the southwest side of the entrance to Delisle Inlet, forming the east end of a flat, ice-covered platform which rises to , situated between Cape Keeler and Miller Point on the east coast of Palmer Land, Antarctica. It was discovered by Sir Hubert Wilkins on a flight of December 20, 1928, and named by him for William B. Mayo of the Ford Motor Company. The cape has been more fully defined on the basis of information resulting from flights by Lincoln Ellsworth in 1935, and from the flights and sledge journey along this coast by members of the East Base of the United States Antarctic Service in 1940.

References

Headlands of Palmer Land